Dennis Roy Yamada (August 20, 1944 – April 12, 2020) was an American politician who served in the Hawaii House of Representatives from 1971 to 1983.

Yamada went to the University of Missouri and Drake University Law School. Yamada practiced law on Kauai. He died on Oahu, Hawaii on April 12, 2020, at age 75.

References

1944 births
2020 deaths
American politicians of Japanese descent
People from Lihue, Hawaii
University of Missouri alumni
Hawaii lawyers
Members of the Hawaii House of Representatives
Hawaii Republicans
Hawaii Democrats
Hawaii politicians of Japanese descent
Drake University Law School alumni